Joan N. Ericksen (born October 11, 1954) is an American lawyer and jurist serving as a senior United States district judge of the United States District Court for the District of Minnesota.

Early life and education
Born in St. Paul, Minnesota, Ericksen graduated from St. Olaf College with a Bachelor of Arts degree in 1977 and later from University of Minnesota Law School with a Juris Doctor in 1981. She earned a Master of Arts degree in political theory from the University of Oxford.

Career
Ericksen began her legal career working in private practice from 1981 to 1983. She was an assistant United States attorney for the District of Minnesota from 1983 to 1993. She was in private practice in Minnesota from 1993 to 1995. She was a judge on the 4th Judicial District Court for Hennepin County, Minnesota, from 1995 to 1998. She was an associate justice of the Minnesota Supreme Court from 1998 to 2002.

Ericksen was nominated to the United States District Court for the District of Minnesota by President George W. Bush on January 23, 2002, to the seat vacated by Paul A. Magnuson. Ericksen was confirmed by the Senate by a 99–0 vote on April 25, 2002, and received her commission on May 1, 2002. She assumed senior status on October 15, 2019.

References

External links

1954 births
Living people
Assistant United States Attorneys
Judges of the United States District Court for the District of Minnesota
Minnesota state court judges
Justices of the Minnesota Supreme Court
St. Olaf College alumni
United States district court judges appointed by George W. Bush
21st-century American judges
University of Minnesota Law School alumni
21st-century American women judges
20th-century American women judges
20th-century American judges